BBC Radio 5 Live is a British national radio station owned and operated by the BBC that broadcasts mainly news, sport, discussion, interviews and phone-ins. It is the principal BBC radio station covering sport in the United Kingdom, broadcasting virtually all major sports events staged in the UK or involving British competitors.

Radio 5 Live was launched in March 1994 as a repositioning of the original Radio 5, which was launched on 27 August 1990. It is transmitted via analogue radio in AM on medium wave 693 and 909 kHz and digitally via digital radio, television and on the BBC Sounds service. Due to rights restrictions, coverage of some events, particularly live sport, is not available online or is restricted to UK addresses.

The station broadcasts from MediaCityUK in Salford in Greater Manchester and is a department of the BBC North division.

According to RAJAR, the station broadcasts to a weekly audience of 5.5 million with a listening share of 3.3% as of December 2022.

History

The success of Radio 4 News FM during the first Gulf War (1991) led the BBC to propose the launch of a rolling-news service. Initially the plan was to broadcast a rolling news service on BBC Radio 4's long wave frequency; but this met with considerable opposition, both internally and externally, so the BBC decided to close BBC Radio 5 and replace the old service's educational and children's programmes with a new news service, whilst retaining the sports programmes. BBC Radio 5 Live began its 24-hour service at 5am on Monday 28 March 1994. The first voice on air, Jane Garvey, later went on to co-present the breakfast and drive-time shows with Peter Allen. The Times described the launch as "slipp[ing] smoothly and confidently into a routine of informative banter" and The Scotsman as "professionalism at its slickest".

The news of the first day was dominated by the fatal stabbing at Hall Garth School near Middlesbrough, the first of many major incidents which the network covered live as they unfolded.

The tone of the channel, engaging and more relaxed than contemporary BBC output, was the key to the channel's success and set the model for other BBC News services later in the decade. The first audiences were some 4 million, with a record audience of 6.25 million. Among the key editorial staff involved in the design of programme formats and recruitment of staff for the new station were Sara Nathan, later editor of Channel 4 News, and Tim Luckhurst, later editor of The Scotsman newspaper and professor of Journalism at the University of Kent.

In 2000, the station was rebranded with a new logo which would remain with the station for another seven years. In addition, on 2 February 2002 a companion station, BBC Radio 5 Live Sports Extra, was launched as a digital-only service to complement the range of sport and to avoid clashes; previously BBC Local Radio stations and the long-wave frequency of BBC Radio 4 were used. Throughout this period, Five Live gained several awards including five Sony Awards in 2005; the single gold award was for its coverage of the 2004 Asian tsunami in the News Story Award category alongside another four silver awards and six nominations. The station also began to further its boundaries with the publication of the Radio Five Live Sporting Yearbook. In August 2007, BBC Radio 5 Live was given a new logo in line with the rest of the BBC Radio network, and a new background design featuring diagonal parallel lines.

In 2008, the BBC announced that the station would move to MediaCityUK in Salford.

In 2017/18, it was noted the station not only remained as having the fourth highest cost-per-user of all the BBC radio output, but whose costs also increased – rising from 2.3p per hour the previous year to 2.5p per hour, therefore equal to 1Xtra. The audience Appreciation Index figure did not increase, remaining at 79.9; and the average length of time spent on the channel fell from 06:41 to 06:34 – the fourth lowest fall of all of the BBC's radio stations.

Broadcast
BBC Radio 5 Live broadcasts in AM on the medium wave frequencies 693 and 909 kHz nationally, with the frequency 990 kHz used in Cardigan Bay in west Wales; these frequencies had been utilised by the old BBC Radio 5, which in turn had taken over the frequencies from BBC Radio 2. Uniquely to the BBC Radio network, it is the only station that is neither purely digital (such as 1Xtra, Radio 4 Extra and 6 Music) nor broadcast in analogue on FM. It is however broadcast in stereo on FM and DAB on BBC Local Radio frequencies overnight, usually from 1am until BBC Local Radio commences morning broadcasts, usually from 5am. BBC Radio 5 Live is also broadcast on BBC Radio Cymru in stereo from midnight until 5:30am, on BBC Radio Scotland from 1am until 6am and on BBC Radio Ulster from midnight until 6:30am. In addition to the AM output, the station also broadcasts digitally in mono on DAB Digital Radio, and on television through satellite services such as Sky, cable services such as Virgin Media, DTT services such as Freeview, Freesat and through IPTV. The station also broadcasts programmes live through BBC Sounds, which allows replaying programmes up to a month after the original broadcast. The service is also available on the Radioplayer internet site partially run by the BBC.

For many years, the station operated from four floors within the News Centre at BBC Television Centre, because of the close connections between the station and BBC News, and the co-location of BBC Sport. However, as part of the corporation's plan to sell off Television Centre, the decision was made in 2008 to move BBC Radio 5 Live to the new broadcast hub at MediaCityUK. The move itself began in September 2011 and took two months. The new studios occupy a single floor in Quay House, with two studios large enough for several guests and a separate studio for large groups. The station continues to have a studio presence in London, with Studio 51A at BBC Broadcasting House in London used for programmes and interviews made in London for the station such as "Kermode and Mayo's Film Review".

List of programmes broadcast on 5 Live 
 Dotun Adebayo (Monday – Friday)
 Wake Up to Money with Sean Farrington, Mickey Clarke and Louise Cooper
 5 Live Breakfast with Rick Edwards and Rachel Burden
 Nicky Campbell (Monday – Friday)
 Naga Munchetty (Monday – Wednesday) & Adrian Chiles (Thursday – Friday)
 Nihal Arthanayake (Monday – Thursday)
 Robbie Savage’s Premier League Breakfast with Robbie Savage (Friday)
 Elis James and John Robins (Friday)
 5 Live Drive with Tony Livesey and Clare McDonnell
 5 Live Sport with Mark Chapman (Monday, Wednesday and Saturday), Kelly Cates (Tuesday), Steve Crossman (Thursday and Sunday) and Darren Fletcher (Friday)
 Colin Murray (Monday – Thursday) & Stephan Nolan (Friday – Sunday)
 5 live Boxing with Mike Costello and Steve Bunce (Saturday)
 Weekend Breakfast with Chris Warburton and Eleanor Oldroyd
 Patrick Kielty (Saturday)
 Tailenders with Greg James, Jimmy Anderson and Felix White (Saturday)
 Fighting Talk with Colin Murray (Saturday)
 Sports Report with Mark Chapman (Saturday)
 606 with Robbie Savage and Chris Sutton (Saturday – Sunday)
 5 live in Short with Chris Warburton (Sunday mornings)
 5 live Science with Chris Smith and the Naked Scientists team (Sunday)
 Helen Skelton (Sunday)
 The Squad with Nick Bright (Sunday)

Programming

News

BBC Radio 5 Live's remit includes broadcasting rolling news and transmitting news as it breaks. It offers news bulletins every half an hour, apart from during live sports commentaries. The BBC's policy for major breaking news events revolves around a priority list. With UK news, the correspondent first records a "generic minute" summary (for use by all stations and channels); the subsequent priority is to report on Radio 5 Live, then the BBC News Channel, and then any other programmes that are on air. For foreign news, first a "generic minute" is recorded, then reports are to World Service radio, then the reporter talks to any other programmes that are on air.

Due to COVID-19, the hourly news bulletins were shared with BBC Radio 2 from April 2020. Three minute bulletins are broadcast on the hour, with extended five minute bulletins at 06:00, 07:00, 08:00, 13:00 and 17:00 on weekdays, at 07:00 and 08:00 on Saturdays and at 06:00, 07:00, 08:00 and 09:00 on Sundays.

Half-hour news headlines are mostly read by presenters and sports journalists, although newsreaders are used during weekday daytime programming between 10:30 and 15:30 and during 5 Live Sport evening and weekend programming.

Sport
BBC Radio 5 Live broadcasts an extremely wide range of sports and covers all the major sporting events, mostly under its flagship sports banner 5 Live Sport. Whilst football commentaries form the majority of live commentaries during the football season, the range of events covered by the station include:

Live Premier League (simulcasted with BBC World Service for international coverage)
 15:00 Saturday matches
 17:30 Saturday night matches
 High profile 14:00 and 16:30 Sunday matches
 15:00 Boxing Day matches
 20:00 Friday night matches
 Select 16:00 Sunday matches on the week 38 only 
 20:00 Wednesday and Thursday night midweek matches
Live FA Community Shield (simulcasted with BBC World Service for international coverage)
Live FA Cup (simulcasted with BBC World Service for international coverage)
 Select third to fifth round ties 
 Select quarter-final ties 
 FA Cup semi-finals (Sundays only)
 FA Cup final 
Live EFL Cup (simulcasted with BBC World Service for international coverage)
 Select second to fourth round ties
 Select quarter-final ties 
 EFL Cup semi-finals
 EFL Cup final
Live Scottish Premiership 
 The Old Firm (simulcast with BBC Radio Scotland)
FIFA World Cup
All Home Nations international football matches
 Friendly matches
 UEFA European Qualifiers
 UEFA Nations League
 UEFA European Championship
 FIFA Women's World Cup 
 UEFA Women's Euro
UEFA Champions League
 Select group stage matches
 Select knockout stage matches
 UEFA Champions League final  
UEFA Europa League
 Select group stage matches
 Select knockout stage matches
 UEFA Europa League final (if British side is involved)
UEFA Europa Conference League
 Select group stage matches
 Select knockout stage matches
 UEFA Europa Conference League final (if British side is involved)
FIFA Club World Cup (if British side is involved)
Olympic Games
Commonwealth Games
Men's Golf Majors, including full coverage of The Open Championship and The Masters 
Ryder Cup
England rugby union test matches
The Autumn Internationals and Six Nations Championship (English, Scottish and Welsh sides only, simulcast with BBC Radio Scotland and Radio nan Gàidheal and BBC Radio Wales and Radio Cymru)
 World Series
Super Bowl
Rugby World Cup
Formula One 
Full coverage of The Grand National and The Cheltenham Festival
Commentary of the Epsom Derby and Royal Ascot 
Boxing
World Athletics Championships
Full coverage of the Wimbledon Tennis Championships
London Marathon
The Boat Race

Controllers

5 Sports Extra

As 5 Live cannot accommodate all of the sports which they have rights to broadcast, some are covered on sister station Sports Extra, including:

Test Match Special commentary of all home England cricket tests, One Day Internationals and T20 Internationals 
Cricket World Cup, ICC Champions Trophy, and Twenty20 World Cup
Selected County Championship, Royal London One-Day Cup and Vitality Blast games from BBC Local Radio
Selected Super League and Challenge Cup Rugby League games 
All 'Grand Slam' Tennis tournaments
Selected Premiership Rugby and European Rugby Champions Cup games from BBC Local Radio
Formula One
IIHF World Championships
Action from any other competition broadcast on 5 Live

Sports Extra typically emphasises full broadcasts of Premier League and Home Nations football, if games overlap each other. 5 Live carries the first-choice match in such cases.

Also, should 5 Live be needed to broadcast news coverage when scheduled sports programmes were to be aired, the sports coverage is shifted to 5 Sports Extra.

The station had originally launched in 2002 as Radio 5 Live Sports Extra but had its name changed in 2022 as part of a rebranding of the BBC.

Awards
In January 2013, BBC Radio Five Live was nominated for the Responsible Media of the Year award at the British Muslim Awards.

See also

List of BBC radio stations

References

External links

 
5
News and talk radio stations in the United Kingdom
Sports radio stations in the United Kingdom
Radio stations established in 1994
1994 establishments in the United Kingdom
Radio stations in the United Kingdom
Mass media in Salford
Organisations based in Salford